John Emery Harriman, Jr. was the inventor of an aerocar in 1906. The patent was issued in 1910. There is no evidence that it was ever manufactured.

Publications
A flying machine of safety, stability, adaptability: the Harriman type aeromobile and aerocar

References

Year of birth missing
Year of death missing
People from Boston
Aviation pioneers